Old Anatolian Turkish (OAT, EAT) is the stage in the history of the Turkish language spoken in Anatolia from the 11th to 15th centuries. It developed into Early Ottoman Turkish. It was written in the Arabic script. Unlike in later Ottoman Turkish, short-vowel diacritics were used.

It had no official status until 1277, when Mehmet I of Karaman declared a firman in an attempt to break the dominance of Persian:

|

|
From now on nobody in the palace, in the divan, council and on travels should speak any language other than Turkish.

History 
It has been erroneously assumed that the Old Anatolian Turkish literary language was created in Anatolia and that its authors transformed a primitive language into a literary medium by submitting themselves to Persian influence. In reality, the Oghuz Turks who came to Anatolia brought their own written language, literary traditions and models from Khwarezm and Transoxiana.

The Ajem Turkic language descended from Old Anatolian Turkish. Ajem Turkic started to form its shape in the Aq Qoyunlu, Qara Qoyunlu eras, and, especially, the Safavid era.

Examples 
Following texts are excerpts of Qabus-Nama, taken from Turan Fikret's work: "Old Anatolian Turkish: Syntactic Structure" (1996):
 : "Our proofs."
 devletlü gişiler: "Fortunate ones."
 zinhār zinhār: "Never."
 pīrlikde yigitlenmek rüsvāylıqdur: "It is a shame to act like a young man in old age."
 bulardan artanı beytü’l mālda qoyalar: "They should put in public treasury that which remained from them."
 birgün bu ilçiyile oturur iken Qısri Büzürcmihre sorar: "One day when he was sitting with this [foreign] ambassador, Chosroes asked Büzürcmihr."
 Kelām-ı mecīd: "The word of the most glorious (God), the Qoran."
 dar'ül-harb: "Countries outside of the domain of Islam."
 Taŋrı aŋa raḥmet itmez: "God does not forgive him."
 aġırlaŋ aṭaŋuzı anaŋuzı egerçi kāfirse daqı: "Respect your parents even if they are unbelievers."
 Ne qul kim alam āzād olsun: "Every slave that I would buy should be freed"
 ve cāhil gişileri gişi sanma ve hünersüzleri bilür sayma: "And do not consider the ignorant ones the [real] men, and [do not consider] the untalented ones the knowledgeable ones."
 zinhār işüŋi ṭanışmaqdan ʿārlanma: "Beware, and never be ashamed of learning your job."
 sen yalan söyleyesi gişi degülsin: "You are not someone who would lie."
 artuq zaḥmet çeküp artuq ṭamaʿ eyleme: "Do not work hard to satisfy your greed."
 eger sen Taŋrıya muṭīʿ olmayup bunlardan muṭīʿlıq isteyüp bunlara zaḥmet virür iseŋ Taŋrılıq daʿvīsin itmiş olursın: "If you yourself do not obey God and ask these people for obedience [for you] and oppress them, then you are considered as someone pretending to be God."
 yaʿnī bir şaḫsuŋ bir sarayda naṣībi olsa andan ol naṣībi ṣatsa ne qadardur bāyiʿyā müşterī bilmese Ebū Ḥanīfeden üç rivāyetdür: "In other words, if someone has a share in a palace and then if he sells it without either seller or buyer knowing the exact value of it, then there are three traditions according to Abû Ḥanîfe."
 benüm dostlarum beni ġāyet sevdüklerinden baŋa ʿaybum dimezler idi ve düşmānlarum benüm ʿaybumı ḫalqa söylerler idi: "Because my friends liked me very much they did not say my shortcomings to me, [but] my enemies told the people my shortcomings."
 ben eyittim sübḥān Allāh qırq iki yaşında gişi neçün şöyle içekim nerdübāŋ ayaġın nice urasın bilmeye düşe ve dün buçuġında neçün şöyle yörüye kim şunuŋ gibi vāqıʿaya uġraya: "I said ‘O God why would a person of forty-two years of age drink so much that he can not judge how to put his feet on the steps of a ladder, so he falls, and also why would he walk like that in the middle of the night when feeling this way."

Orthography

Alphabet

See also
 Ottoman Turkish language
 Turkish language
 Kesik Baş
 Karamanids

References

Turkish language
Anatolian Turkish, Old
Turkic languages
Extinct languages of Asia